The Academy Award for Best Sound is an Academy Award that recognizes the finest or most euphonic sound mixing, recording, sound design, and sound editing. The award used to go to the studio sound departments until a rule change in 1969 said it should be awarded to the specific technicians. The first were Murray Spivack and Jack Solomon for Hello, Dolly!. It is generally awarded to the production sound mixers, re-recording mixers, and supervising sound editors of the winning film. In the lists below, the winner of the award for each year is shown first, followed by the other nominees. Before the 93rd Academy Awards, Best Sound Mixing and Best Sound Editing were separate categories.

For the second and third years of this category (i.e., the 4th Academy Awards and the 5th Academy Awards) only the names of the film companies were listed. Paramount Publix Studio Sound Department won in both years.

Winners and nominees

1930s

1940s

1950s

1960s

1970s

1980s

1990s

2000s

2010s

2020s

Multiple nominations and awards for Best Sound Mixing

Multiple awards and nominations for Best Sound Editing

Multiple awards 

4 awards

 Richard King
 Ben Burtt †

3 awards

 Charles L. Campbell
 Per Hallberg
 Richard Hymns
 Gary Rydstrom

2 awards

 Bub Asman
 Karen Baker Landers
 Christopher Boyes
 Mike Hopkins
 Stephen Hunter Flick †
 Alan Robert Murray
 Paul N. J. Ottosson
 George Watters II
 Ethan Van der Ryn

Multiple nominations 

10 nominations

 Alan Robert Murray

9 nominations

 Richard Hymns

8 nominations

 Gary Rydstrom
 George Watters II
 Ben Burtt †

7 nominations

 Wylie Stateman

6 nominations

 Bub Asman
 Christopher Boyes
 Richard King
 Michael Silvers
 Ethan Van der Ryn

5 nominations

 Stephen Hunter Flick †
 Mark Mangini
 Bruce Stambler
 Matthew Wood

4 nominations

 Lon Bender
 Charles L. Campbell
 Per Hallberg
 John Leveque
 Randy Thom

3 nominations

 Richard L. Anderson †
 Mike Hopkins
 Skip Lievsay
 Paul N. J. Ottosson
 Mark Stoeckinger

2 nominations

 Erik Aadahl
 Karen Baker Landers
 Tom Bellfort
 Steve Boeddeker
 Gloria Borders
 Robert Bratton
 Brent Burge
 Glenn Freemantle
 Eugene Gearty
 Cecelia Hall
 Robert G. Henderson
 Martin Hernández
 Mildred Iatrou Morgan
 Ren Klyce
 Ai-Ling Lee
 Tom Myers
 Walter Rossi
 Philip Stockton
 Oliver Tarney
 Gwendolyn Yates Whittle

† = includes special achievement awards

See also 

 Academy Award for Best Sound Editing
 BAFTA Award for Best Sound
 Critics' Choice Movie Award for Best Sound

Notes

References

Sound

Film sound awards